Bumstead or Bumsted may refer to:

People
Albert H. Bumstead (1875–1940), an American cartographer and inventor
Brad Bumsted, an American journalist
Charles Bumstead (1922–1974), an English footballer 
Eudora Stone Bumstead (1860–1892), an American poet and hymn writer
Henry A. Bumstead (1870–1920), an American physicist
Henry Bumstead (1915–2006), an American cinematic art director and production designer
 Horace Bumstead (1841–1919), a Congregationalist minister and educator
John Bumstead (born 1958), an English footballer
Jon Bumstead (born 1957), an American politician

Other uses
Dagwood Bumstead, a cartoon character 
Bumstead Records, a Canadian record label
Mount Bumstead, a mountain in Antarctica

See also